Delfim Joaquim Maria Martins da Câmara (1834, Magéc. 1916?) was a Brazilian portrait painter.

Biography
He obtained several awards as a student; notably the Great Gold Medal for historical painting (1850), coming in second to Victor Meirelles for a travel scholarship. He made a second attempt to win the scholarship in 1857, but was once again unsuccessful, so he left the Academia to study on his own.

Apparently frustrated in his ambitions to become an artist, he moved to Porto Alegre, shortly before the outbreak of the Paraguayan War; working as an engraver and scenographer. When the war began, he enlisted in the Provincial Army. He was eventually promoted to Captain, and returned to Porto Alegre in 1870. Four years later, he went back to Rio de Janeiro and established a studio near the Imperial Court; devoting himself to portraits.

Initially, he preferred to avoid publicity, but his portrait of the  attracted so much praise at the Court that he suddenly found himself in great demand. Despite this, he continued to live modestly and generally avoided socializing. His reputation was sealed when he received praise from the influential critic, Gonzaga Duque.

After his retirement, he appears to have become a recluse. His date and place of death are not known for certain.

Sources
José Roberto Teixeira Leite. Dicionário crítico da pintura no Brasil. Rio de Janeiro: Artlivre, 1988  
Athos Damasceno. Artes plásticas no Rio Grande do Sul. Porto Alegre: Globo, 1970.

External links

1834 births
1910s deaths
Brazilian painters
Portrait painters
People from Magé